Antonine International School (AIS) is an international school in Ajaltoun, Lebanon. The school serves levels preschool, through senior high school. As part of the Antonine Maronite Order, it offers an English section and a French section, with Lebanese students in both sections participating in an Arabic mother language programme. The AEFE accredits the French section.

References

External links

 Antonine International School
  Antonine International School

International schools in Lebanon
French international schools in Lebanon